Moresche  may refer to:

Moresche (music), 15th-16th century polyphonic musical genre based on Africans in Italy
Moresche (footballer, born 1971), full name Alessandro Moresche Rodríguez, Brazilian football striker
Moresche (footballer, born 1998), full name Matheus Celestino Moresche Rodrigues, Brazilian football forward

See also
Moreschi
Moresca